Edith Cigana (born 15 February 1968) is an athlete from Italy.  She competes in triathlon.

Cigana competed at the first Olympic triathlon at the 2000 Summer Olympics.  She took twenty-seventh place with a total time of 2:07:06.81.

References

1968 births
Living people
Italian female triathletes
Triathletes at the 2000 Summer Olympics
Olympic triathletes of Italy